Nikolaos Papanikolaou (born 24 February 1911, date of death unknown) was a Greek athlete. He competed in the men's triple jump at the 1932 Summer Olympics.

References

1911 births
Year of death missing
Athletes (track and field) at the 1932 Summer Olympics
Greek male triple jumpers
Olympic athletes of Greece
Place of birth missing
Sportspeople from Elefsina